Evering Road is the second studio album by British singer-songwriter Tom Grennan, released on 12 March 2021 through Insanity Records. It was supported by the singles "This Is the Place" and "Little Bit of Love", while the deluxe edition includes the single "Let's Go Home Together" with Ella Henderson. The album debuted at number one on the UK Albums Chart, becoming Grennan's first chart-topping effort.

A special edition of the album was released on 3 September 2021 featuring five additional songs.  The tracks are re-ordered on the digital edition of the album, but the original order is retained on the CD, with the five new songs added at the end, and the 21 tracks spread over two discs.

Background
The title is the name of a street in Hackney, London where Grennan lived with an ex-girlfriend, and the album was partially inspired by their breakup.

Critical reception
David Smyth of the Evening Standard compared Grennan to Lewis Capaldi, positing that the album could be "an attempt to jump ahead [of Capaldi] again" with the bombast of its production (including "stirring violins, gospel choirs and grand flourishes") and Grennan's hoarse voice. Reviewing the album for NME, El Hunt called the album an improvement over Lighting Matches with some "surprising [...] experimental moments" but primarily "nondescript" and "middle of the road", with Hunt wishing that Grennan pushed his sound further.

Writing for British newspaper i, Kate Solomon felt that "Grennan is very good at the contemplative verse-anthemic chorus-contemplative middle-eight structure that lends itself to V Festival sets and his gravelly voice is strong and likeable", but criticised Grennan for having an "aggressive self-interest" on the album and "repeatedly ask[ing] others to make allowances for him" in its lyrics, deeming it "totally devoid of empathy".

Commercial performance
Evering Road debuted at number one on the UK Albums Chart dated 19 March 2021, with 17,000 chart sales, 73% of which came from physical copies.

Track listing

Charts

Weekly charts

Year-end charts

Certifications

References

2021 albums
Tom Grennan albums
Albums produced by TMS (production team)